Mark Leier is a Canadian historian and, since 1994, a professor of working class and left-wing history at Simon Fraser University (SFU). From 2000 to 2010, he was the director of the Centre for Labour Studies at Simon Fraser.

Leier was born in Ladner, British Columbia. Prior to attending university, Leier was employed in various professions, including as a union carpenter and as a member of the Canadian Union of Public Employees. He earned his PhD in History from Memorial University of Newfoundland (MUN) in 1992. 

Politically anarchist, Leier's books have mostly reflected on British Columbia's history of labour radicalism. His first book, Where the Fraser River Flows: The Industrial Workers of the World in British Columbia (1990) deals with the development of industrial unionism in the province. Red Flags and Red Tape: The Making of a Labour Bureaucracy (University of Toronto Press) deals with the institutionalization of a non-revolutionary labour movement. In Rebel Life: The Life and Times of Robert Gosden, Revolutionary, Mystic, Labour Spy (1999), Leier examines the life of an Industrial Workers of the World member (or "Wobbly") turned police labour spy. His fourth book, Bakunin: The Creative Passion is a political biography of the 19th-century Russian anarchist, Mikhail Bakunin.

As part of the Graphic History Collective, he helped produce May Day: A Graphic History of Protest.

A former folk singer, Leier is also known for bringing a banjo to his history classes.

Works
Where the Fraser River Flows: The Industrial Workers of the World in British Columbia. Vancouver: New Star, 1990.
Red Flags and Red Tape: The Making of a Labour Bureaucracy. Toronto: University of Toronto Press, 1995.
Bakunin: The Creative Passion. New York: Seven Stories Press, 2009.
Rebel Life: The Life and Times of Robert Gosden. Vancouver: New Star, 1999. Rev. Ed., 2013.

References

External links
Mark Leier's page at Simon Fraser University
Review of Bakunin: A Biography by Kirkpatrick Sale in The American Conservative

Canadian anarchists
Canadian biographers
Male biographers
20th-century Canadian historians
Canadian male non-fiction writers
Historians of anarchism
Labor historians
Industrial Workers of the World members
Academic staff of Simon Fraser University
Living people
Year of birth missing (living people)
Historians of British Columbia
Historians of the Industrial Workers of the World
People from Delta, British Columbia
21st-century Canadian historians